Kelly Scott was an American football coach. He was the head football at Webber International University located in Babson Park, Florida from 2006–2020.  He was part of the inaugural coaching staff and was promoted from defensive coordinator to head coach in 2006.

Head coaching record

References

External links
 Webber International profile

Year of birth missing (living people)
Living people
American football defensive backs
Manchester Spartans football players
South Carolina Gamecocks football coaches
Webber International Warriors football coaches
High school football coaches in Florida
High school football coaches in Indiana